The Basketball Zweite Liga (B2L) is the second tier basketball league in Austria. The winners of each season are promoted to the Austrian Basketball Superliga (BSL), if meeting the league requirements.

History
The second division was founded in 2006–07, but that season just 4 teams participated. After that season the league was divided in three regional divisions. In the 2011–12 season all teams in the league played each other again. Before the start of the 2013–14 season, both the Bundesliga and 2. Bundesliga were formed to leagues with 11 teams. Since the 2014–15 season, one team that was relegated from the first league will start playing in the second division.

Clubs
 Basket Flames
 BBU Salzburg
 citycenter Amstetten Falcons
 KOŠ Posojilnica Bank Celovec (K)
 BK Mattersburg Rocks
 Panaceo Villach Raiders 
 Raiffeisen Dornbirn Lions 
 Raiffeisen Radenthein Garnets 
 UKJ Hypo Mistelbach 
 Wörthersee Piraten

Champions

References

External links
 Österreichische Basketball Bundesliga Official Website

Basketball leagues in Austria
Austria
Sports leagues established in 2007
2007 establishments in Austria
Professional sports leagues in Austria